Peter Gales (born November 6, 1959) is a former Canadian football quarterback in the Canadian Football League who played for the Hamilton Tiger-Cats. He played college football for the Iowa Hawkeyes.

References

1959 births
Living people
American football quarterbacks
Canadian football quarterbacks
Hamilton Tiger-Cats players
Iowa Hawkeyes football players